Lu Fang is the name of:

 Lu Fang (sport shooter) (born 1972), Chinese sport shooter
 Lu Fang (character), a fictional character from The Seven Heroes and Five Gallants
 Lu Fang (warlord) ( 24–41), general and warlord during the Xin and Eastern Han dynasties

See also
 Lü Fang, a fictional character from Water Margin
 Lufang Township (disambiguation)